Frantzen or Frantzén is a surname. It may refer to:
 Allen Frantzen (born 1947/48), American medievalist
 Björn Frantzén (born 1977), Swedish chef and owner of the Frantzén restaurant
 Jean-Pierre Frantzen (1890–1957), Luxembourgian gymnast and participant at the 1912 Stockholm Olympics
 Jørgen Frantzen (1935–2020), Danish rower and bronze medallist at the 1952 Helsinki Olympics 
 Rose Frantzen American symbolist painter
 Tom Frantzen (born 1954), Belgian sculptor
 William Frantzen (born 1993), Norwegian footballer

See also 
 Franzen (disambiguation)
 Franz (disambiguation)